The Tuntex Tower is a skyscraper office building in Daan District, Taipei, Taiwan. The tower was completed in 1990 and was designed by TMA Architects & Associates. The exterior glass façade of the building forms a pattern to represent the first letter "T" of the Tuntex Group.

History
The building overtook the TWTC International Trade Building in 1990 and became the tallest building in Taiwan from 1990 to 1992, before it was overtaken by Asia-Pacific Financial Plaza in Kaohsiung. However, it remained the tallest in Taipei until it was surpassed by Shin Kong Life Tower in 1993. 

A fire broke out on the 10th floor of the tower on 1st July, 2001. Fortunately, despite seven people being treated for smoke inhalation, no one was injured or died. The fire broke out not long after the tower did not pass a safety inspection done by the Taipei City Government, during which it failed in a total of five categories: smoke detectors, sprinkler systems, fire alarm systems and carbon dioxide detectors.

See also 
 List of tallest buildings in Taiwan
 List of tallest buildings in Taipei

References

1990 establishments in Taiwan
Office buildings completed in 1990
Skyscraper office buildings in Taipei